Nadeh Gandi Khuri (also Romanized as Nadeh Gandī khūrī; also known as Gandī Khūrī) is a village in Tut-e Nadeh Rural District, in the Central District of Dana County, Kohgiluyeh and Boyer-Ahmad Province, Iran. At the 2006 census, its population was 216, in 45 families.

References 

Populated places in Dana County